Ilhéu Quixibá is an uninhabited islet in the Gulf of Guinea and is one of the smaller islands of São Tomé and Príncipe. The islet lies 0.3 km off the southeast coast of the island of São Tomé.

References

Uninhabited islands of São Tomé and Príncipe
Caué District